Miloš Adamović (Serbian Cyrillic: Милош Aдaмoвић; born 19 June 1988 in Šabac, SR Serbia) is a Serbian footballer who currently plays for Mačva Šabac.

Career
In February 2011, he was loaned to Polish club Polonia Warsaw on a half-year deal.

During the 2013 Adamović signed for Ravan Baku of the Azerbaijan Premier League. His first game and first goal for Ravan Baku in an Azerbaijan Premier League against Turan Tovuz PFC.
In May 2014 Adamović left Ravan Baku and joined Hapoel Petah Tikva on a one-year contract. On 12 July, before he made his official debut in Hapoel Petah Tikva, he was released.

In July 2014, Adamović signed for Serbian SuperLiga newcomers Mladost Lučani.

Career statistics

Honours

Club
Sheriff Tiraspol
Divizia Naţională (1): 2009–10
Moldovan Cup (1): 2009–10

References

External links
 
 Player Profile | www.divizianationala.com
 Profile and stats at Srbijafudbal.

1988 births
Living people
Sportspeople from Šabac
Serbian footballers
Association football midfielders
OFK Beograd players
FK Palilulac Beograd players
FK Dinamo Vranje players
FK Mladost Lučani players
FC Sheriff Tiraspol players
FC Taraz players
Polonia Warsaw players
Ravan Baku FC players
Vasas SC players
Ekstraklasa players
Serbian SuperLiga players
Moldovan Super Liga players
Azerbaijan Premier League players
Kazakhstan Premier League players
Serbian expatriate footballers
Serbian expatriate sportspeople in Moldova
Serbian expatriate sportspeople in Poland
Serbian expatriate sportspeople in Kazakhstan
Serbian expatriate sportspeople in Azerbaijan
Serbian expatriate sportspeople in Hungary
Expatriate footballers in Moldova
Expatriate footballers in Poland
Expatriate footballers in Kazakhstan
Expatriate footballers in Azerbaijan
Expatriate footballers in Hungary
FK Radnik Surdulica players
FK Mačva Šabac players